The Journal of Headache and Pain is a peer-reviewed open access medical journal covering research on headache and related types of pain. It was established in 2000 and is published by BioMed Central. It is the official journal of the European Headache Federation and Lifting The Burden. The editor-in-chief is Paolo Martelletti (Sapienza University of Rome). According to the Journal Citation Reports, the journal has a 2020 impact factor of 7.277.

References

External links

Anesthesiology and palliative medicine journals
BioMed Central academic journals
Publications established in 2000
English-language journals
Creative Commons Attribution-licensed journals